This is an incomplete list of drawings by Hieronymus Bosch, many of which have survived to the present day. A number represent alternate incarnations or preparatory sketches for his paintings.

Bosch's works are generally organized into three periods of his life dealing with the early works (c. 1470–1485), the middle period (c.1485–1500), and the late period (c. 1500 until his death). According to Stefan Fischer, thirteen of Bosch's surviving paintings were completed in the late period, with seven surviving paintings attributed to his middle period. Bosch's early period is studied in terms of his workshop activity and possibly some of his drawings. There are no surviving paintings attributed to before 1485.

See also
 List of paintings by Hieronymus Bosch

References